Richard Benyon De Beauvoir (1769–1854) MP was a 19th-century British landowner, philanthropist and High Sheriff of Berkshire.

Background
He was born Richard Benyon in Westminster on 28 April 1769, one of four sons and five daughters of Richard Benyon MP of Gidea Hall in Essex and Englefield House, Berkshire and his wife  Hannah Hulse, the eldest daughter of Sir Edward Hulse, 1st Baronet of Breamore House, Hampshire.

Estates and names
Richard Benyon succeeded to his father's estates in 1796. In 1814, after succeeding to the estates of his half-uncle Powlett Wrighte of Englefield House (who had died in 1779) he assumed the name of Richard Powlett-Wrighte; and, in 1822, after the death of his distant relative, the Rev. Peter De Beauvoir, Rector of Davenham in Essex, from whom he inherited very large property, both in estates and in the funds, he assumed the name of Richard De Beauvoir.

In 1824 he purchased the Culford Estate, near Bury St Edmunds, Suffolk, for £230,000, including the timber, from Louisa, Marchioness Cornwallis, widow of Charles, 2nd Marquis Cornwallis. The  estate also included the parishes of Culford, Ingham, Timworth, West Stow and Wordwell. He was reputed to be worth over 7 million. His land agent was Robert Todd and his head gardener was William Armstrong and these two men dealt with day-to-day work on the estate, particularly when Mr Benyon was not in residence. New flint and brick estate workers' cottages were under construction at Culford, as can be seen in letters between Richard Benyon de Beauvoir and Robert Todd. The dwellings won an award for their sensible design; they still stand along Main Road, Culford, today, surrounded by their large gardens. In letters dated 19 April and 6 May 1825 Todd writes that the Armstrongs have a troublesome marriage; "she has experienced not only insult but blows" and, in the later letter, "P.S. Armstrong and his wife are parted. She left Culford last Tuesday, is in lodgings in Bury at present."

In 1883 John Bateman listed farmland inherited from R. B. de Beauvoir in his compilation: he had the Rev. Edward Richard Benyon, of Culford Hall, Bury St. Edmunds, (born 1802), as holding in Suffolk 10,060 acres (worth 6,928 per annum rental), in Essex 601 acres (worth 848 guineas per annum), and in Huntingdon 3 acres (worth 8 guineas per annum).
Meanwhile, Bateman describes Richard Fellowes Benyon, of Englefield, as having in Berkshire 10,129 acres (worth 13,303 guineas per annum); in Essex 3,438 acres (worth 5,163 guineas per annum); and in Hampshire 2,440 acres (worth 1,538 guineas per annum).

Offices and charitable works
Richard Benyon De Beauvoir was a member of parliament (MP) for Pontefract from 1802 to 1806, and for Wallingford during two parliaments, from 1806 to 1812. He was a Justice of the Peace and Deputy Lieutenant for the county of Berkshire. He was High Sheriff of Berkshire in 1816. When the Royal Berkshire Hospital was founded at Reading, Mr. Benyon contributed the huge sum of £5,000 and, by his liberality, aided materially in the formation of that invaluable charity. A ward in the hospital was subsequently named after him. He was considered by far the richest commoner in Berkshire.

Family
He married, on 27 September 1797, Elizabeth the only daughter of Sir Francis Sykes, Bart, of Basildon Park in Berkshire. This lady died on 29 October 1822. As they had no children, when Richard died on 22 March 1854, his estates were inherited by his nephew, Richard Fellowes, the son of William Henry Fellowes of Ramsey Abbey in Huntingdonshire, who also took on the name of Benyon.

References

Sources 
 The Gentleman's Magazine & Historical Review 1854
 De Beauvoir Conservation Area Extension, Conservation Area Appraisal, London Borough of Hackney, 1998.

External links 
 

English philanthropists
High Sheriffs of Berkshire
Members of the Parliament of the United Kingdom for English constituencies
People from Englefield, Berkshire
People from Romford
People from De Beauvoir Town
English landowners
People from Westminster
UK MPs 1802–1806
UK MPs 1806–1807
UK MPs 1807–1812
1769 births
1854 deaths
Benyon family